Made in France (working title: L'Enquête) is a 2015 French thriller crime drama film directed by Nicolas Boukhrief and co-written by Boukhrief with Éric Besnard. Filming began on 25 August 2014 in Paris, and wrapped on 3 October 2014. The film had its premiere at the 20th Busan International Film Festival in October 2015.

Plot 
Sam, a freelance journalist, decides to investigate the growing phenomenon of disaffected youth joining Islamic extremist groups. He infiltrates a group of four young people who have been tasked with the creation of a jihadist cell and whose mission is to destabilise the city centre of Paris.

Cast 
 Malik Zidi as Sam
 Dimitri Storoge as Hassan
 François Civil as Christophe 
 Nassim Si Ahmed as Driss
 Ahmed Dramé as Sidi
 Franck Gastambide as Dubreuil 
 Judith Davis as Laure 
 Nailia Harzoune as Zora 
 Nicolas Grandhomme as Herbelin 
 Assaad Bouab as The imam
 Malek Oudjail as Ahmed 
 Laurent Alexandre as the tattooed man

Release 
The film was initially set for release in early 2015. However, the original distributor SND Films exited the project after the January 2015 Île-de-France attacks, apparently due to the sensitivity of the subject matter. The rights to the film were then acquired by Pretty Pictures.

The release was delayed to 18 November 2015; however following the Paris attacks on 13 November 2015, Pretty Pictures withdrew the promotional campaign and delayed release again. The film was released on video-on-demand on TF1 on 29 January 2016.

The postponement made international news. It was reported in the United States SA (e.p. Los Angeles Times, Time, Daily News, The Washington Examiner), Australia (e.p. SBS, News.com.au), Great Britain (e.p.The Guardian, The Daily Telegraph), Germany (e.p.Stern, Handelsblatt, Focus, Der Tagesspiegel
), Italy (e.p. The Huffington Post and Il Foglio) and other countries all over the world.

References

External links 
 

2015 films
2010s French-language films
Films directed by Nicolas Boukhrief
Films scored by Robin Coudert
French crime thriller films
2015 crime thriller films
2010s French films